Paryan District is a district of Panjshir Province, Afghanistan. The estimated population in 2019 was 16,452 and was estimated to increase to 17,033 by 2021.

See also
 Districts of Afghanistan

Referencing

Districts of Panjshir Province